The black-tipped cotinga (Carpodectes hopkei), also known as the white cotinga, is a species of bird in the family Cotingidae. It is found in the Chocó region, from southeastern Panama to northwestern Ecuador ; its natural habitat is subtropical or tropical moist lowland forests. The male, being white, is conspicuous, but in general it is an uncommon species.

Description
The male is pure white except for a narrow black tip to the outer wing feathers and, in young individuals, a black tip to the central tail feathers. The female looks very different, having the head and upper parts brownish-grey, and the wings and tail brownish-black. The wing-coverts and the inner flight feathers have broad white margins. The underparts are pale grey fading to white on the belly.

Ecology
The white plumage of the male makes it very conspicuous, especially when it perches on an emergent branch high above the canopy or when it flies in its typical slow, looping manner. It is more gregarious than birds in the closely related genus Cotinga, often making swooping flights in mixed-sex groups. No song or call is known for this bird.

Status
The total population of this bird has not been quantified but it is believed to be declining overall. Destruction of lowland forests, especially in Ecuador, is causing the population locally to diminish but this bird is not yet considered to be a vulnerable species. The bird has a very large range, and although it is generally uncommon, the International Union for Conservation of Nature has rated it as a "least-concern species" because it does not believe that either the decline in its range, nor in its total population, is sufficient to put it in a more threatened category.

References

black-tipped cotinga
Birds of the Tumbes-Chocó-Magdalena
black-tipped cotinga
Taxonomy articles created by Polbot